is a stable of sumo wrestlers, part of the Tokitsukaze ichimon or group of stables. It was set up in June 2002 by former komusubi Ōyutaka, who branched off from Tokitsukaze stable. At the end of 2009 the stable produced its first sekitori, the Chinese born (but ethnic Mongolian) Sōkokurai who in 2013 returned to active sumo after a two-year absence when his dismissal for match-fixing was nullified by the courts. The stable is home to the half-Japanese, half-Filipino wrestler Kōtokuzan. As of January 2023, the stable has 14 wrestlers. The stable's second sekitori, Wakatakakage, reached jūryō in May 2018, and the makuuchi division for the first time in November 2019. In the July 2021 honbasho he became the first wrestler from the stable to reach the rank of komusubi. In the January 2022 honbasho, Wakatakakage became the first wrestler from the stable to reach the rank of sekiwake. Wakatakakage won the March 2022 honbasho.

Apart from its human residents, the Arashio was home to the cats Moru and Mugi, former strays which were adopted by the stable. Mugi died in 2019.

In March 2020 Sōkokurai became the new Arashio-oyakata when his stablemaster reached the mandatory retirement age of 65.

The stable is a popular for sumo fans to visit, as photos with the wrestlers are available, and there is a large window to view training from outside.

On 31 December 2020, the Japan Sumo Association announced that one of Arashio stable's top wrestlers, maegashira Wakatakakage, had tested positive for COVID-19. Subsequent testing revealed that a total of twelve members of the stable contracted the virus, including its stablemaster, a hairdresser, jūryō wrestler Wakamotoharu and eight wrestlers from the lower divisions.

Owner
2020–present: 9th Arashio Eikichi (shunin, former maegashira Sōkokurai)
2002-2020: 8th Arashio Shūji (former komusubi Ōyutaka)

Notable active wrestlers
Wakatakakage (best rank, sekiwake)
Wakamotoharu (best rank, komusubi)
Kōtokuzan (best rank, maegashira)

Notable former wrestlers

Sōkokurai (former maegashira 2)

Referee
Shikimori Kazuki (makushita gyōji, real name Kazuki Sasai)

Hairdresser
Tokojin (first class Tokoyama)
Tokomitsu (fourth class tokoyama)

Location and access

Tokyo, Chuo Ward, Nihonbashi Hamacho 2-47-2
3 minute walk from Hamachō Station on Toei Shinjuku Line

See also
List of sumo stables
List of active sumo wrestlers
List of past sumo wrestlers
Glossary of sumo terms

References

External links
Official site 
Japan Sumo Association profile
Article on Arashio stable
BBC article on Arashio stable

Active sumo stables